This is a list of events in animation in 2013.

Events

January
 January 6: The Simpsons episode "Homer Goes to Prep School" premieres, guest starring singer Tom Waits.

February
 February 4: Japanese animation studio Science SARU is founded by director Masaaki Yuasa and producer Eunyoung Choi.
 February 24: The 85th Academy Awards premiere, hosted by Seth MacFarlane.
 Brave by Mark Andrews and Brenda Chapman wins the Academy Award for Best Animated Feature.
 Paperman by John Kahrs wins the Academy Award for Best Animated Short Film.

March
 March 10: The Simpsons episode "Black Eyed, Please" premieres, guest starring Richard Dawkins and having the couch gag animated by Bill Plympton, the second time he has done so.
 March 22: The Croods, a film by DreamWorks Animation is released.

April
 April 7: The first episode of Attack on Titan is broadcast.
 April 23: The first episode of Teen Titans Go! airs.

May
 May 7: 40th Annie Awards
 May 12: The Simpsons episode "The Fabulous Faker Boy" premieres, guest starring Justin Bieber and having the couch gag animated by the crew of Robot Chicken.
 May 19: The Simpsons episode "The Saga of Carl" premieres, in which the family travels to Iceland, guest starring rock group Sigur Rós. The same evening another episode, "Dangers on a Train" airs, guest starring Seth MacFarlane.

June
 June 1: The Hub renamed to Hub Network.

July
 July 2: The Animation Domination High-Def block launches in the Fox Broadcasting Company.
 July 17: Turbo, a comedy film about the Indianapolis 500, was released by DreamWorks.

August
 August 12: The first episode of PAW Patrol is broadcast.

September
 September 4: Futurama aired its final episode on Comedy Central after four seasons and 52 episodes. The show would be revived again in 2022, with Hulu ordering 20 episodes for 2023.
 September 27: Cloudy with a Chance of Meatballs 2 is released from Sony Pictures Animation to positive reviews.

October
 October 6: The Simpsons episode "Treehouse of Horror XXIV" premieres, with the couch gag being directed by Guillermo del Toro.
 October 7: PBS Kids rebrands with new promos and bumpers, PBS Kids Preschool Block and PBS Kids Go! was shut down, and Peg + Cat premieres to positive reviews.

November
 November 13: PBS Kids Sprout renamed to Sprout.
 November 22: Walt Disney Pictures releases Frozen, which will become a global phenomenon.
 November 24: The Family Guy episode "Life of Brian" premieres, in which Brian Griffin dies.

December
 December 2: Rick and Morty debuts on Adult Swim.
 December 15: Due to negative fan reaction, Brian Griffin is revived in the Family Guy episode "Christmas Guy".
 December 18: The Hole is added to the National Film Registry.

Awards
 Academy Award for Best Animated Feature: Frozen
 Academy Award for Best Animated Short Film: Mr Hublot
 Animation Kobe Feature Film Award: The Garden of Words
 Annecy International Animated Film Festival Cristal du long métrage: Rio 2096: A Story of Love and Fury
 Annie Award for Best Animated Feature: Frozen
 Asia Pacific Screen Award for Best Animated Feature Film: Koo! Kin-Dza-Dza
 BAFTA Award for Best Animated Film: Frozen
 César Award for Best Animated Film: Loulou, l'incroyable secret
 European Film Award for Best Animated Film: The Congress
 Golden Globe Award for Best Animated Feature Film: Frozen
 Goya Award for Best Animated Film: Underdogs
 Japan Academy Prize for Animation of the Year: The Wind Rises
 Japan Media Arts Festival Animation Grand Prize: Approved for Adoption
 Mainichi Film Awards - Animation Grand Award: The Tale of the Princess Kaguya

Films released

 January - Leapfrog: The Magnificent Museum of Opposite Words (United States)
 January 10 - Knight Rusty (Germany)
 January 12 - Hunter × Hunter: Phantom Rouge (Japan)
 January 18 - Dragon Guardians (Spain)
 January 19 - Jungle Master (China)
 January 22 - Leapfrog: Adventures in Shapeville Park (United States)
 January 23 - Pororo, The Racing Adventure (China and South Korea)
 January 24 - The Mythical Ark: Adventures in Love & Happiness (China)
 January 29 - Batman: The Dark Knight Returns – Part 2 (United States)
 January 30 - Miffy the Movie (Denmark and Netherlands)
 January 31 - Roco Kingdom: The Desire of Dragon (China)
 February 1 - Berserk Golden Age Arc III: The Advent (Japan)
 February 7 - Otto the Rhino (Denmark)
 February 9 - Star Driver: The Movie (Japan)
 February 14 - My Wife's a Cat (China)
 February 15 - Escape from Planet Earth (United States and Canada)
 February 22 - The Legend of Sarila (Canada)
 February 23 - A Certain Magical Index: The Movie – The Miracle of Endymion (Japan)
 February 26 - Barbie in the Pink Shoes (United States)
 February 28:
 Ctyrlístek ve sluzbách krále (Czech Republic)
 Extraordinary Tales (Belgium, France, and Luxembourg)
 March 3 - Bold Eagles (Norway)
 March 5 - VeggieTales: The Little House That Stood (United States)
 March 8 - Lisa Limone and Maroc Orange: A Rapid Love Story (Estonia)
 March 9 - Doraemon: Nobita no Himitsu Dōgu Museum (Japan)
 March 16 - Pretty Cure All-Stars New Stage 2: Kokoro no Tomodachi (Japan)
 March 18 - Cheech & Chong's Animated Movie (United States)
 March 21 - Pinocchio (Italy, France, Belgium, and Luxembourg)
 March 22:
 The Adventures of Sinbad (India)
 The Croods (United States)
 Silver Circle (United States)
 March 25 - Sid The Science Kid: The Movie (United States)
 March 30:
 Dragon Ball Z: Battle of Gods (Japan)
 Hanasaku Iroha: Home Sweet Home (Japan)
 April 5 - Rio 2096: A Story of Love and Fury (Brazil)
 April 11 - Ku! Kin-dza-dza (Russia)
 April 13 - Aura: Maryūinkōga Saigo no Tatakai (Japan)
 April 19 - Anina (Uruguay)
 April 20:
 Crayon Shin-chan: Stupid Horse!: B-class Gourmet Survival (Japan)
 Detective Conan: Private Eye in the Distant Sea (Japan)
 Jay & Silent Bob's Super Groovy Cartoon Movie (United States)
 Steins;Gate: Fuka Ryōiki no Déjà vu (Japan)
 April 24 - Iron Man: Rise of Technovore (Japan)
 May 3 - Chhota Bheem and the Throne of Bali (India)
 May 9 - Death & the Robot (United States)
 May 10 - Saint Young Men (Japan)
 May 24:
 Epic (United States)
 Once Upon a Time (India)
 May 26 - Xi Bai Po: Wang Er Xiao (China)
 May 31:
 The Garden of Words (Japan)
 Kuiba 2 (China)
 June 2 - Happy Little Submarine 3：Rainbow Treasure (China)
 June 6 - Poe (United States)
 June 8 - Haru (Japan)
 June 14 - Legends of Oz: Dorothy's Return (United States and India)
 June 16:
 My Little Pony: Equestria Girls (United States and Canada)
 The Soccer Way (China)
 June 21 - Monsters University (United States)
 June 29 - Le Le Xiong Qi Huan Zhui Zong (China)
 June 30 - Happy Heroes (China)
 July 3:
 The Congress (France, Israel, Belgium, Poland, Luxembourg and Germany)
 Despicable Me 2 (United States)
 July 6 - Gintama: The Movie: The Final Chapter: Be Forever Yorozuya (Japan)
 July 12 - Seer 3 (China)
 July 13 - Pokémon the Movie: Genesect and the Legend Awakened (Japan)
 July 17:
 Aya of Yop City (France)
 Turbo (United States)
 July 18 - Underdogs (Argentina and Spain)
 July 19 - Adventure at Flaming Mountains (China)
 July 20:
 Short Peace (Japan)
 The Ultimate Task (China)
 The Wind Rises (Japan)
 July 23 - Robotech: Love Live Alive (United States and Japan)
 July 30 - VeggieTales: MacLarry and the Stinky Cheese Battle (United States)
 August - Princess Twins of Legendale (United States)
 August 1 - I Love Wolffy 2 (China)
 August 2:
 Axel: The Biggest Little Hero (China)
 Kunta (China)
 August 7 - Oggy and the Cockroaches: The Movie (France)
 August 9 - Planes (United States)
 August 14 - Til Sbornia Do Us Part (Brazil)
 August 24:
 Hakuōki Part 1 (Japan)
 Hakuōki Part 2 (Japan)
 August 27 - Barbie: Mariposa & the Fairy Princess (United States)
 August 31 - Anohana: The Flower We Saw That Day (Japan)
 September 2 - Thomas & Friends: King Of The Railway (United Kingdom)
 September 7:
 Space Pirate Captain Harlock (Japan)
 The World of Goopi and Bagha (India)
 September 10 - Asphalt Watches (Canada)
 September 13:
 Hiroku: Defenders of Gaia (Spain)
 Hokus pokus Albert Åberg (Norway)
 September 17 - Dick Figures: The Movie (United States)
 September 20 - Justin and the Knights of Valour (Spain)
 September 26 - No-Eared Bunny and Two-Eared Chick (Germany)
 September 27 - Cloudy with a Chance of Meatballs 2 (United States)
 September 28 - Kara no Kyōkai: Mirai Fukuin (Japan)
 October 8:
 Alpha and Omega 2: A Howl-iday Adventure (United States and Canada)
 Bratz: Go to Paris the Movie (United States)
 October 10 - The Olsen Gang in Deep Trouble (Denmark)
 October 17 - Tarzan (United States and Germany)
 October 22:
 Barbie & Her Sisters in A Pony Tale (United States)
 VeggieTales: Merry Larry and the True Light of Christmas (United States)
 October 23 - My Mommy is in America and she met Buffalo Bill (France)
 October 24 - Prince Ivan and the Firebird (Russia)
 October 25 - Khumba (South Africa)
 October 26 - Gekijō-ban Mahō Shōjo Madoka Magica Shinpen: Hangyaku no Monogatari (Japan)
 October 27 - Metalocalypse: The Doomstar Requiem (United States)
 October 30 - Jasmine (France)
 November 1:
 Free Birds (United States)
 Saving Santa (United Kingdom and United States)
 November 7 - Husiti (Czech Republic)
 November 8 - Louis & Luca and the Snow Machine (Norway)
 November 9 - Patema Inverted (Japan)
 November 10 - How to Catch a Feather from the Firebird (Russia)
 November 16 - The Lost 15 Boys: The Big Adventure on Pirates' Island (China and Japan)
 November 17:
 Jack and the Cuckoo-Clock Heart (France)
 Minuscule: Valley of the Lost Ants (France)
 November 20:
 Gekijō-ban Tiger & Bunny -The Beginning- (Japan)
 The Magic Snowflake (France)
 November 21:
 The Art of Happiness (Italy)
 The Fake (South Korea)
 November 22:
 Ayas (Turkey)
 Frozen (United States)
 November 23: 
 Bayonetta: Bloody Fate (Japan)
 The Tale of Princess Kaguya (Japan)
 Persona 3 The Movie: Chapter 1, Spring of Birth (Japan)
 December 1 - Voyage Extraordinaire (China)
 December 3 - Iron Man & Hulk: Heroes United (United States)
 December 5:
 El extraordinario viaje de Lucius Dumb (Spain)
 Plaster of Paris (United States)
 December 7 - Lupin the 3rd vs. Detective Conan: The Movie (Japan)
 December 9 - A Beating Heart and Cracked Ceiling (United States)
 December 11 - Still Living in God's Universe (United States)
 December 18 - Wolfy, the Incredible Secret (France and Belgium)
 December 20:
 Moshi Monsters: The Movie (United Kingdom)
 Walking with Dinosaurs (United Kingdom, United States, Australia, and India)
 Worms (Brazil)
 December 25:
 Emil & Ida i Lönneberga (Sweden)
 The House of Magic (Belgium and France)
 December 26 - Ivan Tsarevich and the Gray Wolf 2 (Russia)
 December 27:
 Hunter × Hunter: The Last Mission (Japan)
 Space Panda (China)
 December 28:
 The Frog Kingdom (China)
 Majocco Shimai no Yoyo to Nene (Japan)
 Specific date unknown:
 The Charge (China)
 The Little Fishgirl (Czech Republic)
 My Little World (United States)
 Odyssey 2050 The Movie (Costa Rica)
 Train Heroes (China and Japan)

Television series debuts

Television series endings

Deaths

January
 January 7: Huell Howser, American television personality, actor, producer, writer and singer (voice of Backson in Winnie the Pooh, himself in The Simpsons episode "Oh Brother, Where Bart Thou?"), dies from prostate cancer at age 67.
 January 30: Patty Andrews, American singer (co-sang the Johnny Fedora and Alice Blue Bonnet segment in Make Mine Music, and Little Toot in Melody Time), dies at age 94.

February
 February 1: Robin Sachs, English actor (voice of Silver Surfer in Fantastic Four, Sergeant Sam Roderick in the SpongeBob SquarePants episode "Mrs. Puff, You're Fired"), dies from a heart attack at age 61.
 February 10: W. Watts Biggers, American writer (co-creator of Underdog), dies at age 85.
 February 16: Harald Siepermann, German comics artist and animator (Alfred J. Kwak), dies at age 50.
 February 17: Richard Briers, British actor (narrator of Roobarb and Noah and Nelly in... SkylArk, voice of Noddy in the 1975 Noddy TV series and Fiver in Watership Down), dies at age 79.
 February 21:
 Bob Godfrey, British animator (Roobarb, Noah and Nelly in... SkylArk, Henry's Cat, Great), dies at age 91.
 Armen Mirzaian, Iranian-born American animator, storyboard artist (Cartoon Network Studios, Hasbro Studios, Hulk and the Agents of S.M.A.S.H.) and writer (Adventure Time), dies from a car accident at age 35.

March
 March 5: Goro Naya, Japanese voice actor (voice of Inspector Zenigata in Lupin III), dies at age 83.
 March 7: Max Ferguson, Canadian radio personality and actor (voice of Hulk in The Marvel Super Heroes), dies at age 89.
 March 13: Malachi Throne, American actor (voice of God in Animaniacs, Mongke in Avatar: The Last Airbender, Ranakar in Green Lantern: First Flight, Fingers in the Batman Beyond episode "Speak No Evil", The Judge in The New Batman Adventures episode "Judgement Day"), dies at age 84.
 March 20: Jack Stokes, British animator and film director (worked on Yellow Submarine and Roobarb), dies at age 92.
 March 26: Don Payne, American screenwriter and producer (The Simpsons), dies at age 48.
 March 28: Manuel García Ferré, Argentine cartoonist and animator (Hijitus), dies at age 83.

April
 April 8: Greg Kramer, British-Canadian author, actor, director and magician (voice of Anton in George and Martha, Nemo in Arthur, additional voices in Tripping the Rift), dies at age 52.
 April 11: Jonathan Winters, American actor and comedian (voice of Mr. Freebus and Roger Gustav in The Completely Mental Misadventures of Ed Grimley, Grandpa and Papa Smurf in The Smurfs franchise, Coach Cadaver in Gravedale High, Wade Pig in Tiny Toon Adventures: How I Spent My Summer Vacation, The Thief in Arabian Knight, narrator in Frosty Returns, Santa Claus in Santa vs. the Snowman 3D, Old Clown in the Johnny Bravo episode "I Used to Be Funny", Sappy Stanley in the Tiny Toon Adventures episode "Who Bopped Bugs Bunny?", Stinkbomb D. Basset in the Animaniacs episode "Smell Ya Later", himself and Maude Frickert in The New Scooby-Doo Movies episode "The Frikert Fracas"), dies at age 87.
 April 13: József Gémes, Hungarian animator and film director (Heroic Times, Willy the Sparrow), dies at age 73.
 April 14: Mike Road, American actor (voice of Race Bannon in Jonny Quest, Zandor in The Herculoids, Ugh in Space Ghost and Dino Boy), dies at age 95.
 April 16: Pat Summerall, American football player and sportscaster (voiced himself in The Simpsons episode "Sunday, Cruddy Sunday"), dies from cardiac arrest at age 82.
 April 27: Kathleen Fleming, American producer (The Lego Group), dies in an accident at age 39.

May
 May 7: Ray Harryhausen, American animator and special effects creator (Mighty Joe Young, The Beast from 20,000 Fathoms, The 7th Voyage of Sinbad, Jason and the Argonauts, Clash of the Titans), dies at age 92.
 May 13: Dr. Joyce Brothers, American psychologist, television personality, advice columnist and writer (voiced herself in The Simpsons episode "Last Exit to Springfield", and the Pinky and the Brain episode "The Pinky and the Brain Reunion Special"), dies from respiratory failure at age 85.
 May 16: Mike Stuart, British animator (The Beatles, Yellow Submarine, Teenage Mutant Ninja Turtles, The Wind in the Willows) and director (The World of Peter Rabbit and Friends, Kipper), dies at an unknown age.
 May 18:  Arthur Malet, English actor (voice of Mr. Ages in The Secret of NIMH, King Eidilleg in The Black Cauldron, Jesaja in Felidae, Travelling Salesman and Major Domo in Anastasia), dies at age 85.
 May 31: Jean Stapleton, American actress (voice of Mrs. Jenkins in Pocahontas II: Journey to a New World), dies at age 90.

June
 June 11: Babi Floyd, American actor and singer (voice of Sock and Vowells Announcer in the Between the Lions episode "The Lost Rock", Face in Nick Jr. ads, additional voices in Courage the Cowardly Dog, performed the Pokérap in Pokémon: Indigo League, announcer for Nickelodeon and Nick on CBS), dies from cancer at age 59.
 June 19: James Gandolfini, American actor and producer (voice of Carol in Where the Wild Things Are), dies from a heart attack at age 51.
 June 20: John David Wilson, British animator and animation producer (Walt Disney Company, UPA, Fine Arts Films, the animated opening sequence of Grease, Peter Pan and the Pirates), dies at age 93.
 June 21: Jerry Dexter, American actor (voice of Chuck in Shazzan, Alan in Josie and the Pussycats, Ted in Goober and the Ghost Chasers, Aqualad in Aquaman, Sunfire in Spider-Man and His Amazing Friends), dies at age 78.
 June 29: Ryūtarō Nakamura, Japanese film director and animator (Serial Experiments Lain, Kino's Journey, Ghost Hound, Despera), dies at age 58.

July
 July 8: Eunice Macaulay, British animator and film producer  (Special Delivery), dies at age 90.
 July 13: Cory Monteith, Canadian actor and musician (voice of Finn Hudson in The Cleveland Show episode "How Do You Solve a Problem Like Roberta?", himself in The Simpsons episode "Elementary School Musical"), dies from an alcohol and heroin overdose at age 31.
 July 14: Tonino Accolla, Italian actor (dub voice of Homer Simpson in The Simpsons), dies at age 64.
 July 30: Ron Dias, American animator and painter (worked for Don Bluth and Walt Disney Company), dies at age 76.
 July 31: Michael Ansara, American actor (voice of Mr. Freeze in the DC Animated Universe, General Warhawk in Rambo: The Force of Freedom, Vashtar in the Thundarr the Barbarian episode "Prophecy of Peril", Hiawatha Smith in the Spider-Man and His Amazing Friends episode "Quest of the Red Skull"), dies at age 91.

August
 August 5: Louis Scarborough Jr., American animator and storyboard artist (Teenage Mutant Ninja Turtles, Adventures of Sonic the Hedgehog, ChalkZone), dies from cancer at age 60.
 August 7: Hiroshi Ogawa, Japanese animator (worked for Shin-Ei Animation) and film director (Crayon Shin-chan), dies from stomach cancer at age 62.
 August 11: Henry Polic II, American voice actor (voice of Jonathan Crane / Scarecrow in Batman: The Animated Series, Baba Looey in Yo Yogi!, Tracker Smurf in The Smurfs), dies at age 68.
 August 19: Lee Thompson Young, American actor (voice of Jermaine in Xiaolin Showdown, Teen Bebe in The Proud Family episode "Twins to Tweens"), commits suicide at age 29.

September
 September 16: Hiram Titus, American composer and orchestrator (ALF Tales, Attack of the Killer Tomatoes, Saban's Adventures of the Little Mermaid), dies at age 66.
 September 19: Tom McLaughlin, American animator (Eureeka's Castle), storyboard artist (The Adventures of the Galaxy Rangers, Duckman, Jumanji, DIC Entertainment), sheet timer (Warner Bros. Animation, BattleTech: The Animated Series, Aaahh!!! Real Monsters, Teenage Mutant Ninja Turtles, Iznogoud, Dino Babies, Darkstalkers, Biker Mice from Mars, Bureau of Alien Detectors, X-Men: The Animated Series, Men in Black: The Series, The Legend of Tarzan, DIC Entertainment, Cartoon Network Studios, Pet Alien, Wolverine and the X-Men, Avengers Assemble, Kaijudo), director (Space Strikers, Jumanji, Silver Surfer) and producer (Silver Surfer), dies at age 56.

October
 October 1: Tom Clancy, American novelist (voiced himself in The Simpsons episode "Diatribe of a Mad Housewife"), dies from heart failure at age 66.
 October 14: Ginger Dinning, American singer (sang "Blame It on the Samba" in Melody Time), dies at age 89.
 October 17: Lou Scheimer, American animation producer (founder of Filmation), voice actor (voice of Dumb Donald in Fat Albert and the Cosby Kids, Orko and Stratos in He-Man and the Masters of the Universe) and composer (He-Man and the Masters of the Universe), dies at age 84.  
 October 21: José Luis Beltrán Coscojuela, Spanish comic artist and animator, dies at age 82.
 October 25: Marcia Wallace, American actress and comedian (voice of Edna Krabappel and Ms. Melon in The Simpsons, Clovis, Mrs. Cavanaugh and Didi Lovelost in Darkwing Duck, 'Dark Interlude' Actress in the Batman: The Animated Series episode "Mudslide", Mrs. Blossom in The Addams Family episode "Sweetheart of a Brother", Mrs. Wheeler in the Captain Planet and the Planeteers episode "Talkin' Trash", Oopa in the Aladdin episode "The Game", Old Woman in the I Am Weasel episode "Driver's Sped", Mrs. Beaver in The Angry Beavers episode "If You In-Sisters", Mrs. Rapple in the Rugrats episode "Lil's Phil of Trash", additional voices in Camp Candy and Monsters University), dies from pneumonia and sepsis at age 70.
 October 31: Toby Bluth, American illustrator, theatrical director, animator and background artist (Walt Disney Animation Studios, Hanna-Barbera, Banjo the Woodpile Cat, Mickey, Donald, Goofy: The Three Musketeers) and brother of Don Bluth, dies at age 73.

November
 November 28: Danny Wells, Canadian actor (voice of Bush and Raul in Heathcliff, Luigi in The Super Mario Bros. Super Show!, King Hugo III in Potatoes and Dragons, Gus in Willa's Wild Life), dies from cancer at age 72.

December
 December 3: Avo Paistik, Estonian film director, animator and illustrator (Lend, Tolmuimeja, Klaabu, Nipi ja tige kala, Klaabu kosmoses, Naksitrallid, Naksitrallid II), dies at age 77.
 December 14: Peter O'Toole, English actor (voice of Sherlock Holmes in Sherlock Holmes and the Baskerville Curse, Pantaloon in The Nutcracker Prince, Anton Ego in Ratatouille), dies at age 81.
 December 24: Frédéric Back, Canadian animator and film director (Crac, The Man Who Planted Trees), dies at age 89.
 December 26: Harold Whitaker, English animator and comics artist (Animal Farm), dies at age 93.
 December 31: James Avery, American actor (voice of Shredder in Teenage Mutant Ninja Turtles, James Rhodes/War Machine in Iron Man and Spider-Man, Haroud Hazi Bin in Aladdin), dies at age 68.

Specific date unknown
 Robert Henry, Canadian film editor (Nelvana), dies at an unknown age.

See also
2013 in anime

References

External links 
Animated works of the year, listed in the IMDb

 
2010s in animation
2013